Sunil Alagh is an Indian businessman. He regularly appears on Indian television and is on the board of multiple companies, including Prasar Bharati India and United Breweries.

He is a former managing director and chief executive officer of Britannia Industries, an Indian food corporation. He joined Britannia in December 1974 and was the company's managing director for over a decade.

After his exit from Britannia, Alagh founded a consulting firm, SKA Advisors, which advises clients on marketing strategies. He was appointed as the President of the All India Management Association (AIMA) in 2004. He was also the host of The Job Show on CNBC India, the first televised job hunt on Indian television.

In 2020, he was appointed as advisory board chief at Vikas Multicorp.

Personal life 
Alagh is married to Maya Alagh, an actress. Their daughter, Anjori Alagh is also an actress and his son-in-law, Sameer Nair, is a senior media executive and CEO of Applause Entertainment.

Alagh is an alumnus of Indian Institute of Management Calcutta.

References

Indian Institute of Management Calcutta alumni
Businesspeople from Kolkata
Indian chief executives
Living people
Year of birth missing (living people)